Sebastian Heidinger (born 11 January 1986) is a German footballer who plays as a right back or right midfielder.

Career
From 2005 to 2007 Heidinger played for SC Pfullendorf in the Regionalliga Süd. In the 2007–08 season, he moved to Fortuna Düsseldorf in the Regionalliga Nord. Düsseldorf was promoted to the 3. Liga in the same season and in the year after to the 2. Bundesliga. Heidinger scored his first goal in the 2. Liga on 13 December 2009 against Rot-Weiß Oberhausen.

In the 2010–11 season, Heidinger joined Arminia Bielefeld where he signed a two-year contract, but left the club a year later to sign for RB Leipzig. At RB Leipzig, he helped the club to back-to-back promotions in the 2012-13 and 2013-14 seasons.

On 19 January 2016, he joined Greuther Fürth.

In the 2016–17 winter transfer window Heidinger moved to 3. Liga club SC Paderborn 07 making 16 appearances with 1 goal and 2 assists in the second half of the season.
 
In June 2017, Heidinger joined newly promoted 2. Bundesliga side Holstein Kiel on a one-year contract. Paderborn let him leave on a free transfer.

On 25 August 2018, Haidinger joined FSV Wacker 90 Nordhausen. In October 2019, he was relegated to the club's reserve team alongside 4 other teammates. He left the club at the end of the year.

Honours
Bayern Munich
German A-Junior Championship: 2004

Fortuna Düsseldorf
3. Liga: Runners-Up 2008-09

RB Leipzig
3. Liga: Runners-Up 2013-14

Paderborn
Westphalian Cup: 2016-17

References

External links
 Profile at Soccerway

1986 births
Living people
People from Miltenberg
Sportspeople from Lower Franconia
Association football midfielders
German footballers
Fortuna Düsseldorf players
Viktoria Aschaffenburg players
Arminia Bielefeld players
RB Leipzig players
2. Bundesliga players
3. Liga players
SC Pfullendorf players
1. FC Heidenheim players
SpVgg Greuther Fürth players
SC Paderborn 07 players
Holstein Kiel players
FSV Wacker 90 Nordhausen players
Footballers from Bavaria